The Puerto Rico Open is a defunct women's tennis tournament. The first edition dates back to 1971 but only from 1986 to 1993 was the tournament played every year. It was held in San Juan, Puerto Rico and was played on outdoor hard courts. In 1988, when Tier categories were first introduced on the WTA Tour, the Open became part of Tier IV. One last edition was played in 1995, this time featuring in Tier III.

Results

Singles

Doubles

External links
 WTA Results Archive

 
Hard court tennis tournaments
Tennis tournaments in Puerto Rico
WTA Tour
Puerto Rico Open
Puerto Rico Open
Defunct tennis tournaments in Puerto Rico
Defunct sports competitions in Puerto Rico